The 1958–59 season was the 79th season of competitive football in England.

Diary of the season
August 1958: The Football League season begins with the new national Third and Fourth divisions that have been created from the old Third Division North and Third Division South.

30 August 1958: The Football Association snub Manchester United's wish to participate in the 1958–59 European Cup.

September 1958: Manchester United pay a national record fee of £45,000 for Sheffield Wednesday inside-forward Albert Quixall.

12 November 1958: Wolverhampton Wanderers play their first European Cup game, drawing 2–2 at home to Schalke 04 in the first round first leg.

18 November 1958: Wolverhampton Wanderers lose 2–1 to Schalke 04 in the European Cup first round second leg in West Germany, ending their hopes of being the first team other than Real Madrid (winners of the first three competitions) to win the European Cup.

15 January 1959: Second Division Liverpool suffer a shock FA Cup third round exit when they lose 2-1 to non league Worcester City.

4 April 1959: Jeff Hall, 29, right-back for Birmingham City and England, dies from polio, prompting widespread takeup of the polio vaccine. 

2 May 1959: Nottingham Forest defeat Luton Town 2–1 in the 1959 FA Cup Final.

Notable debutants

8 September 1958: Bobby Moore, 17-year-old wing-half, makes his debut for West Ham United against Manchester United in the First Division.

Notable retirements

May 1959: Billy Wright, 35, Wolverhampton Wanderers and England captain, after more than 500 appearances for his club and a record 105 for his country.

June 1959: Jackie Blanchflower, 26, Manchester United and Northern Ireland centre-half, who announced his retirement as a player after failing to recover sufficiently from injuries sustained in the Munich air disaster 16 months earlier.

Honours

Notes = Number in parentheses is the times that club has won that honour. * indicates new record for competition

Awards
Football Writers' Association
 Footballer of the Year – Syd Owen (Luton Town)

Football League

First Division
In the last season of captain Billy Wright's playing career, Wolves retained their First Division title - the third time they had been league champions in six seasons. There was every reason to hope for continued success in the post-Wright era, though, with younger players like Bobby Mason and Mickey Lill excelling in the team. Manchester United enjoyed a good return in the season following the Munich tragedy, as new signings and younger players integrated with crash survivors to achieve runners-up spot in the league. Arsenal, Bolton Wanderers and West Bromwich Albion completed the top five, while newly promoted West Ham United recorded their highest league finish yet by finishing sixth.

Second Division
Sheffield Wednesday sealed an immediate return to the First Division as Second Division champions, being joined by runners-up Fulham.

Third Division
Plymouth Argyle won the first championship of the new national Third Division, with Hull City finishing one point behind them in second place. Norwich City made the headlines with their run to the semi-finals of the FA Cup, but the cup run distracted them from the league as fourth place in the final table was not enough for promotion.

Fourth Division
Port Vale were champions of the new Fourth Division, and were joined in promotion by Coventry City, York City and Shrewsbury Town.

Top goalscorers

First Division
Jimmy Greaves (Chelsea) – 33 goals

Second Division
Brian Clough (Middlesbrough) – 42 goals

Third Division
Jim Towers (Brentford) – 32 goals

Fourth Division
Arthur Rowley (Shrewsbury Town) – 37 goals

National team
Although the England national football team eventually shared victory in the 1959 British Home Championship with Northern Ireland, it was a tough year without so many of the squad's key players lost in the Munich air disaster the year before. The season concluded with a disastrous tour of the Americas, in which the team lost three successive games before restoring some pride in the final match against the USA. The final game against the USA was also the last match for veteran defender and captain Billy Wright after a then record 105 caps. The match was played in front of just 13,000 fans on a gravel pitch in Los Angeles.

Tour of the Americas

References